The Huansu S7 is a 7-seat mid-size CUV produced by Huansu, a sub-brand of BAIC Motor and Yinxiang Group.

Overview 

The Huansu S7 is manufactured by Beiqi Yinxiang Automobile, and essentially the 7-seater variant of the Huansu S5 which is based on the same platform as the Senova X55, the Huansu S7 was officially launched in Q4 2017, with prices ranging from 78,800 yuan to 115,800 yuan at launch.

The Huansu S7 is powered by a 1.5-litre turbocharged four-cylinder petrol engine with 150 hp mated to a five-speed manual transmission.

Huansu S7L
The Huangsu S7L is a sports appearance variant of the S7 and was launched in April 2018. The S7L is powered by a 2.0-litre turbo engine of the regular S7 while featuring a redesigned front end.

References

External links 

 Official Website

Cars introduced in 2017
Crossover sport utility vehicles
front-wheel-drive vehicles
2010s cars
Cars of China